John's Incredible Pizza Company is an American all-you-can-eat buffet restaurant and entertainment business founded by John Parlet in 1997. The company has 10 locations on the United States West Coast as of March 2022. Its corporate office is located in Rancho Santa Margarita, California.

Themed dining rooms 
Each John's location is approximately 60,000 square feet and has five or six themed dining rooms depending on location. 
Cabin Fever is similar to a Lake Tahoe-style environment with pine chairs, log-covered walls and a fireplace. The Toon Time Theatre (or FUN-Ology) plays cartoons on the television (either programming by Cartoon Network's Boomerang or Disney Junior depending on location) and projection screens throughout the room. The Hall of Fame is like a sports bar with team memorabilia and games on the big-screen televisions. The Vertical Room is an extreme sports room where the customer can watch motocross racing, extreme golf, surfing, snowboarding, or Disney XD. The Fusion Room, or the retreat room, is a room that plays music videos. The Veranda Room is an adult-centered tropical-themed dining room that presents a resort-like atmosphere with windows and wood furnishings. The Kaleidoscope is a room with various lights and hues.

See also
 List of buffet restaurants
 List of pizza chains of the United States

References

External links 
 

Buffet restaurants
Pizza chains of the United States
Restaurant chains in the United States
Restaurants in California
Theme restaurants
Video arcades
Victorville, California
Entertainment companies established in 1997
Restaurants established in 1997
American companies established in 1997
1997 establishments in California
Companies based in Orange County, California